Russkoye Pole is a rural locality (a khutor) in Frolovskoye Rural Settlement, Permsky District, Perm Krai, Russia. The population was 1 as of 2010. There are 4 streets.

Geography 
Russkoye Pole is located 36 km southeast of Perm (the district's administrative centre) by road. Kanabekovo is the nearest rural locality.

References 

Rural localities in Permsky District